Pseudapriona flavoantennata is a species of beetle in the family Cerambycidae, and the only species in the genus Pseudapriona. It was described by Stephan von Breuning in 1936.

References

Petrognathini
Beetles described in 1936